CED9 may be:

 CED9 (gene), a notable gene
 Taltheilei Narrows Water Aerodrome, CED9 ICAO airport code